László Pekár (born 20 January 1993) is a Hungarian football player who plays for Nyíregyháza.

Club career
On 30 September 2022, Pekár returned to Nyíregyháza on a two-year contract.

International career
In November 2015 he was part of the Hungary national squad for the UEFA Euro 2016 play-offs against Norway.

Club statistics

Updated to games played as of 27 June 2020.

References

External links
Player profile at HLSZ 

1993 births
People from Szolnok
Sportspeople from Jász-Nagykun-Szolnok County
Living people
Hungarian footballers
Hungary youth international footballers
Hungary under-21 international footballers
Association football forwards
Kecskeméti TE players
Nyíregyháza Spartacus FC players
Puskás Akadémia FC players
Mezőkövesdi SE footballers
Vasas SC players
Nemzeti Bajnokság I players
Nemzeti Bajnokság II players